Jamie Delgado and Jamie Murray defeated Simon Greul and Alessandro Motti 3–6, 6–4, [12–10] in the final.

Seeds

Draw

Draw

References
 Doubles Draw

Trani Cup - Doubles
Trani Cup